Aber-giar is a village in the community of Llanllwni in Carmarthenshire, Wales.

Villages in Carmarthenshire